Italian-Slovenian relations are foreign relations between Italy and Slovenia.

The two countries share -long border, notably traversing the cross-border urban area of Gorizia and Nova Gorica. The border also includes a panhandle where the Italian city of Trieste is located on the Adriatic Sea, surrounded by Slovenia in three directions.

Italy and Slovenia established diplomatic relations in 1992. Italy has an embassy in Ljubljana and a consulate in Koper. Slovenia has an embassy in Rome and consulates in Trieste, Florence and Milan. Both countries are full members of the European Union and NATO.

In addition to the autochthonous minorities, the Istrian Italians in Slovenia and the Slovene Italians in Italy, there are around 3,200 people of Slovenian descent living in Italy . Approximately 400,000 Italians visit Slovenia every year.

See also 
 Italy–Yugoslavia relations
 Accession of Slovenia to the European Union

References

 

 
Slovenia
Bilateral relations of Slovenia
1992 establishments in Europe